Rabie Abdel El-Hoti (born 19 June 1985) is a Libyan futsal player.

Abdel played for the Libya national futsal team at the 2008 FIFA Futsal World Cup.

Honors

National Team 
 African Futsal Championship:
 2008
 Arab Futsal Championship:
 2007, 2008

Individual 
 Arab Futsal Championship:
 Best Player: 2008
 Sulta Shaab Cup 2009:
 Best Player

References

1985 births
Living people
Libyan men's futsal players